Dicolectes rugulosus is a species of leaf beetle. It is distributed in the Democratic Republic of the Congo, Sudan and Ivory Coast. It was described by Édouard Lefèvre in 1886.

References 

Eumolpinae
Beetles of the Democratic Republic of the Congo
Insects of Sudan
Insects of West Africa
Taxa named by Édouard Lefèvre
Beetles described in 1886